K.V.N. Naik S.P. Sanstha Foundation was established on 10 May 1999, It was named  as "Krantveer Vasantrao Narayanrao Naik Shikshan Prasarak Sanstha. The institution is registered as Charitable Trust under the Bombay Public Trust Act, further Trust is registered under the section 12A and Section 80G of Income Tax Act.

Courses
K.V.N. Naik S.P. Sanstha's Polytechnic offers diploma engineering studies in five disciplines:
 Civil Engineering
 Mechanical Engineering (Shift 1 & 2)
 Electronics and Telecommunication Engineering
 Computer Engineering
 Electrical Engineering

Campus
The Academic and administrative building has 7 floors housing all instructional and administrative facilities including class rooms, computer center, laboratory, library, resource center, seminar hall principal office visitors lounge, staff rooms, administrative office, placement office, stores, boys common room, girls common room etc. which is also equipped with Ultra-modern Laboratories, Workshops, Classrooms, vast Playgrounds Gymnasium and Cafeteria.

Admission
Admission to the diploma courses is through the CAP rounds conducted by DTE, Maharashtra (Based on SSC scores).

References
http://www.kvnnaikeducation.in
https://www.dtemaharashtra.gov.in/approvedinstitues/StaticPages/frmInstituteSummary.aspx?InstituteCode=5367
https://web.archive.org/web/20110830073716/http://msbte.org/

External links 
 

Universities and colleges in Maharashtra
Education in Nashik
Engineering colleges in Maharashtra
Educational institutions established in 1978
1999 establishments in Maharashtra